Graham Gilles (born 25 November 1946) is an Australian sprint canoer who competed in the mid-1970s. He was eliminated in the semifinals of the K-4 1000 m event at the 1976 Summer Olympics in Montreal.

References

1946 births
Australian male canoeists
Canoeists at the 1976 Summer Olympics
Living people
Olympic canoeists of Australia